Charles Thacker may refer to:

Charles M. Thacker (1866–1918), a Justice of the Oklahoma Supreme Court
Charles P. Thacker (1943–2017), an American pioneer computer designer